"Shake Your Foundations" is a song and single by Australian hard rock band AC/DC, written by Angus and Malcolm Young and Brian Johnson.

The single was released in November 1985, taken from their 1985 album Fly on the Wall. The track was remixed by Harry Vanda and George Young, who worked with AC/DC on earlier albums, and released on Who Made Who, the soundtrack to the Stephen King film Maximum Overdrive. In this short remix, the song is shortened from 4:10 to 3:53. The drum track begins at seventeen seconds and the full band kicks in at 48 seconds. Also, Johnson's vocals can be heard more clearly in the remix. Vinyl releases of the album include the remix, while most CD releases include the original version.

Personnel
Brian Johnson – lead vocals
Angus Young – lead guitar
Malcolm Young – rhythm guitar
Cliff Williams – bass guitar
Simon Wright – drums

Charts

References
 
 

AC/DC songs
1986 singles
1985 songs
Songs written by Angus Young
Songs written by Brian Johnson
Songs written by Malcolm Young